Doulishan Town is an urban town in and subdivision of Lianyuan, Hunan Province, People's Republic of China.

Administrative division
The town is divided into 40 villages and 1 community, the following areas: Xianghuatai Community, Xianghua Village, Jinling Village, Tianjing Village, Dazhi Village, Bilin Village, Huimin Village, Shiba Village, Shaoyuan Village, Mingjing Village, Fangba Village, Zubao Village, Xingjia Village, Yanzhong Village, Shitang Village, Dongjie Village, Zengjiatang Village, Kengtian Village, Shengjiachong Village, Dongli Village, Yunpan Village, Huaiyuan Village, Taishang Village, Huanggang Village, Fengrui Village, Ganxi Village, Shaping Village, Baishu Village, Zigeng Village, Xiongjia Village, Dayang Village, Heguan Village, Ganquan Village, Gaota Village, Mabai Village, Tuoli Village, Hua'e Village, Jianshe Village, Baifeng Village, Shanyuan Village, and Tangxi Village.

Divisions of Lianyuan